Ibn Mubarak is a surname. Notable people with the surname include:

 Abd Allah ibn al-Mubarak (726–797), Iranian muhaddith
 Abu'l-Fazl ibn Mubarak (1551–1602), Persian writer
 Muhammad ibn Mubarak ibn Hamad Al Khalifah (born 1935), Bahraini politician

Arabic-language surnames